

268001–268100 

|-id=057
| 268057 Michaelkaschke ||  || Michael Kaschke (born 1957), the president and CEO of Carl Zeiss AG, a German manufacturer of optical systems and optoelectronics. Kaschke is a sponsor of scientific and social projects, university research, as well as instrumental for the creation of the German Optical Museum Jena. || 
|}

268101–268200 

|-id=115
| 268115 Williamalbrecht ||  || William B. Albrecht (1917–2009), an American amateur astronomer || 
|}

268201–268300 

|-id=242
| 268242 Pebble ||  || Pebble Johnson (born 1971), an American teacher of middle-school science and technology in Forsyth County, Georgia || 
|}

268301–268400 

|-bgcolor=#f2f2f2
| colspan=4 align=center | 
|}

268401–268500 

|-bgcolor=#f2f2f2
| colspan=4 align=center | 
|}

268501–268600 

|-bgcolor=#f2f2f2
| colspan=4 align=center | 
|}

268601–268700 

|-id=669
| 268669 Bunun ||  || The Bunun, a native tribe of Taiwan || 
|-id=686
| 268686 Elenaaprile || 2006 GW || Elena Aprile (born 1954) is an Italian physicist, who teaches at Columbia University in New York. She is head of the Xenon1T experiment at Laboratori Nationali Gran Sasso (LNGS), which is searching for dark matter. || 
|}

268701–268800 

|-bgcolor=#f2f2f2
| colspan=4 align=center | 
|}

268801–268900 

|-bgcolor=#f2f2f2
| colspan=4 align=center | 
|}

268901–269000 

|-bgcolor=#f2f2f2
| colspan=4 align=center | 
|}

References 

268001-269000